The women's VL3 competition at the 2021 ICF Canoe Sprint World Championships in Copenhagen took place on Lake Bagsværd.

Schedule
The schedule was as follows:
All times are Central European Summer Time (UTC+2)

Results

Heats
The fastest three boats in each heat advanced directly to the final. The next four fastest boats in each heat, plus the fastest remaining boat advanced to the semifinal.

Heat 1

Heat 2

Semifinal
The fastest three boats advanced to the final.

Final
Competitors raced for positions 1 to 9, with medals going to the top three.

References

ICF
ICF